The 2008 Ladies European Tour was a series of golf tournaments for elite female golfers from around the world which took place from January through December 2008. The tournaments were sanctioned by the Ladies European Tour (LET).

The tour featured 28 official money events with prize money totalling more than €10.5 million, as well as the Women's World Cup of Golf and the European Ladies Golf Cup. Gwladys Nocera won the Order of Merit with earnings of €391,839.58, ahead of Helen Alfredsson, who finished second despite only having played in three events. Melissa Reid won Rookie of the Year honours, after finishing 12th in the Order of Merit.

Tournament results
The table below shows the 2008 schedule. The numbers in brackets after the winners' names show the number of career wins they had on the Ladies European Tour up to and including that event. This is only shown for members of the tour.

Major championships in bold.

Order of Merit rankings

See also
2008 LPGA Tour
2008 in golf

References

External links
Official site of the Ladies European Tour
Ladies European Tour Information Centre

Ladies European Tour
Ladies European Tour
Ladies European Tour